The King Abdullah II Stadium is a multi-purpose stadium in Amman, Jordan. It is currently used mostly for football matches. The stadium holds 13,265 people.

International football matches

References

External links
WorldFootball profile

Football venues in Jordan
Sports venues in Amman
Multi-purpose stadiums in Jordan
1999 establishments in Jordan
Tourist attractions in Amman
Al-Wehdat SC
Sports venues completed in 1999